Petrus Stockmans (Antwerp, 1608 - Brussels, 1671) was a Belgian legal advisor, a university professor, Latin-language writer and Hellenist.

Works
 Deductio ex qua probatur clarissimis argumentis, non esse ius deuolutionis in Ducatu Brabantiae, nec in aliis Belgii prouinciis, ratione principum earum, prout quidam conati sunt asserere
 Jus Belgarum circa bullarum pontificiarum receptionem, Leodii: apud Sebastianum Creel, 1645
 Defensio Belgarum contra evocationes et peregrina judicia, etc., Leodii: apud Sebastianum Creel, 1665
 Deductio ex qua clarissimis argumentis probatur contra Gallos non esse ius devolutionis in ducatu Brabantiae; nec in aliis Belgii provinciis, ratione principum eorum, prout quidam illorum conati sunt asserere. Das ist: deductions-schrifft in welcher wider die Frantzosen mit sonnenklaren grunden bewiesen wird. Dass derselben konige in dem hertzogthumb Brabant und andern Niederlandischen provincien kein recht der devolution oder heimfallung habe wie ihrer etliche zu behaupten sich unterstanden, S.l.: s.n., 1667
 Deductio ex qua probatur clarissimis argumentis, non esse jus devolutionis in ducatu Brabantiae, nec in aliis Belgi provinciis, ratione principum earum, prout quidam conati sunt afferre, Amstelodami : apud Petrum Le Grand, 1667
 Tractatus de jure devolutionis, authore D. Petro Stockmans, Amstelodami: apud Petrum Le Grand, 1667-1668
 Clarissimi Petri Stockmans Opera quotquot hactenus seperatim edita fuere omnia, nunc primum in vnum corpus collecta & emendatiora prodeunt, Bruxellis : typis Judoci de Grieck, apud portam lapideam, sub signo S. Huberti, 1686
 Clarissimi ac amplissimi viri d. Petri Stockmans Opera omnia, quotquot hactenus separatim edita fuere nunc primum in unum corpus collecta & emendatiora prodeunt, Bruxellis : apud Judocum de Grieck, apud Portam lapideam, sub signo S. Huberti. Apud Franciscum Serstevens, prope Templum pp. praedicatorum, 1700

1608 births
1671 deaths
Jansenists
Jurists of the Spanish Netherlands
Writers from Antwerp
Academic staff of the Old University of Leuven